Lily McNair is an American academic administrator who served as the president of Tuskegee University, a historically black university in Tuskegee, Alabama, from 2018 to 2020.

Biography

Early life and education 
McNair is from New Jersey. She earned a bachelor's degree in psychology at Princeton University, graduating in 1979. She then earned her Master's and doctoral degrees from Stony Brook University. Her thesis examined alcohol consumption among female college students.

During school, she worked as a psychologist in Poughkeepsie, New York at Vassar College and Stony Brook University.

Academic career 
After graduating from Stony Brook University, McNair joined the University of Georgia as an Associate Professor of Psychology in 1992. She was the first African-American woman in the Department of Psychology to become a professor and became associate director of the Clinical Psychology Doctoral Training program. Her research was funded by the National Institute of Mental Health and the Centers for Disease Control and Prevention, and focused on community interventions targeting substance abuse in African-American Youth. She was co-editor of Women: Images and Realities.

McNair joined Spelman College in 2004, working as Associate Provost of Research. She worked with NASA on a Women in Science and Engineering program that sought to increase the number of minority students in science and technology. She also worked with the National Institutes of Health and the Howard Hughes Medical Institute to ensure Spelman College became the leading institution for women of African descent.

In 2011 McNair joined Wagner College as Provost and Vice President for Academic Affairs. While at Wagner College, she increased the diversity of faculty hired by 116%. She established the annual Black History Month scholar symposium. She is a Trustee of Integration Charter Schools.

McNair was appointed as the eighth President of Tuskegee University in July 2018. She later took medical leave in January 2020, and it was announced on March 26, 2021, that she would not be returning to the university. Dr. McNair was president from July 2018 to June 30, 2021.

References 

20th-century American psychologists
Spelman College faculty
Wagner College people
Tuskegee University faculty
African-American psychologists
Stony Brook University alumni
Princeton University alumni
American women psychologists
Living people
21st-century American psychologists
Year of birth missing (living people)